ReJoyce: The Christmas Album is the fourth studio album and first Christmas album by American pop singer Jessica Simpson. It was released by Columbia Records on November 23, 2004. The album features cover versions of popular Christmas songs and includes a duet with her sister, Ashlee Simpson, on the song "Little Drummer Boy". Additionally, it also includes a duet with Nick Lachey, Simpson's husband at the time, on "Baby, It's Cold Outside". The cover of Amy Grant's "Breath of Heaven (Mary's Song)" was notable, as Simpson has said that Amy Grant is one of her favorite recording artists and her role model. 
Two singles were released from the album: "Let It Snow, Let It Snow, Let It Snow" and "What Christmas Means to Me" (although no accompanying video was produced). Song "O Holy Night" had an accompanying music video.

ReJoyce: The Christmas Album was released after Simpson's most successful studio album of her career In This Skin (2003). The album has sold 669,000 copies in the United States, as of February 23, 2009, according to Nielsen SoundScan, and has been certified Gold by the Recording Industry Association of America in January 2005.

Critical reception

The album garnered generally positive reviews from music critics. Stephen Thomas Erlewin editor of AllMusic, said: "ReJoyce: The Christmas Album, never approaches the old-fashioned manners implied in the title and instead wallows in the big, brassy, over-the-top spectacle of show biz. Rejoyce is a Christmas album that sounds like it was recorded at a Las Vegas revue. It's filled with showstoppers and grandstanding, relying on the tried-and-true seasonal classics while offering a couple of new songs almost as an afterthought. It's bright and incessantly cheerful, always seeming loud even during its quietest moments because the music itself is bold and brassy. While she sounds a little too breathy on occasion, Simpson acquits herself well on the record, and the entire enterprise will surely please her fans, particularly those who like her persona just a little bit better than her singing".

Commercial performance
The album debuted at number sixteen on the Billboard 200 with 152,000 copies. After a week the album peaked at number fourteen on the Billboard 200. As of February 23, 2009, the album has sold a total of 669,000 copies in the United States and has been certified Gold by the Recording Industry Association of America (RIAA).

Track listing
All tracks were produced by Billy Mann, except for "Breath of Heaven (Mary's Song)" which was produced by Mann and Chris Rojas.

A Special Limited Edition Christmas Collection 

Simpson's first extended play (EP), titled A Special Limited Edition Christmas Collection, was packaged with the ReJoyce: The Christmas Album deluxe edition that was made available exclusively on her official music store.

Track listing

Charts

Weekly charts

Year-end charts

Singles

Certifications

References

2004 Christmas albums
Christmas albums by American artists
Pop Christmas albums
Jessica Simpson albums